Hylemera is a genus of moths in the family Geometridae erected by Arthur Gardiner Butler in 1878.

Species
Some species of this genus are:
Hylemera aetionaria (Swinhoe, 1904)
Hylemera altitudina Viette, 1970
Hylemera altivolans Viette, 1970
Hylemera andriai Viette, 1970
Hylemera azalea (Prout, 1925)
Hylemera butleri Viette, 1970
Hylemera cadoreli Viette, 1970
Hylemera candida Butler, 1882
Hylemera cunea Viette, 1970
Hylemera decaryi Viette, 1970
Hylemera ecstasa Viette, 1970
Hylemera elegans Viette, 1970
Hylemera euphrantica (Prout, 1932)
Hylemera fletcheri Viette, 1970
Hylemera fragilis Butler, 1879
Hylemera griveaudi Viette, 1970
Hylemera herbuloti Viette, 1970
Hylemera hiemalis Viette, 1970
Hylemera hypostigmica (Prout, 1925)
Hylemera instabilis Viette, 1970
Hylemera laurentensis Viette, 1970
Hylemera lemuria Viette, 1970
Hylemera lichenea Viette, 1970
Hylemera mabillei Viette, 1970
Hylemera malagasy Viette, 1970
Hylemera marmorata Viette, 1970
Hylemera nivea Butler, 1882
Hylemera pauliani Viette, 1970
Hylemera perrieri Viette, 1970
Hylemera plana (Butler, 1879)
Hylemera prouti Viette, 1970
Hylemera puella Butler, 1879
Hylemera rebuti (Poujade, 1889)
Hylemera roseidaria Viette, 1970
Hylemera sogai Viette, 1970
Hylemera sparsipuncta Viette, 1970
Hylemera subaridea Viette, 1970
Hylemera teleutaea (Prout, 1925)
Hylemera tenuis Butler, 1878
Hylemera vinacea Viette, 1970

References

Geometridae